Monster a Go-Go! is a 1965 American science-fiction horror film directed by Bill Rebane and Herschell Gordon Lewis (who remained uncredited in association with this film). The film is considered to be one of the worst films ever made.

Plot
The plot concerns an American astronaut, Frank Douglas, who mysteriously disappears from his spacecraft as it parachutes to Earth. The policemen in one scene inspect the landing site of Douglas's capsule and notice a burned patch, only to dismiss it as a prank. The vanished astronaut is apparently replaced by or turned into a large, radioactive, humanoid monster. This is revealed when it comes into the scene and kills off Dr. Logan. A team of scientists and military men also attempts to capture the monster – and at one point succeed and imprison it in the lab, only to have it escape. Neither the capture nor the escape is ever shown, and both are simply mentioned by the narrator.

At the end of the film, the scientists corner the monster in a sewer under Chicago, but the monster suddenly disappears.  The scientists receive a telegram stating that Douglas is in fact alive and well, having been rescued in the North Atlantic, perhaps implying the monster was an alien impersonating Douglas. The narrator provides the film's closing dialogue:

Cast
 Henry Hite as Frank Douglas/the Monster
 June Travis as Ruth
 Phil Morton as Col. Steve Connors
 Peter M. Thompson as Dr. Chris Manning
 Herschell Gordon Lewis as Radio announcer (uncredited)
 Bill Rebane as Narrator

Production
The film had an unusual production history. Director Rebane ran out of money while making the film. Herschell Gordon Lewis, who needed a second film to show with his own feature, Moonshine Mountain, bought the film, added a few extra scenes, included some new dialogue, and then released it, creating an odd, disjointed film with little continuity. Rebane had abandoned the film in 1961; Lewis did not finish the film until 1965, so he was unable to gather all of the original cast, resulting in almost half the characters disappearing midway through the film to be replaced by other characters who fill most of the same roles. One of the actors Lewis was able to rehire had dramatically changed his look in the intervening years, necessitating his playing the brother of the original character. At one point, when a phone supposedly rings, the sound effect is obviously a person making a noise with his mouth.

Release and reception
In 1993, the film was featured in an episode of the satirical film-riffing television series Mystery Science Theater 3000 on Comedy Central alongside the short Circus on Ice.

Monster a Go-Go! was released with Psyched by the 4-D Witch as a DVD double feature by Something Weird Video.

The MST3K version of the film was released by Rhino Home Video as part of the Collection, Volume 8 DVD set. It was soon re-released by Shout Factory The film's original director, Bill Rebane, released a "Special Collector's Edition" with commentary and other extras on Synergy Entertainment on October 19, 2010.

Critical reception has been predominantly negative, with the film regarded as being one of the all-time worst.

Allmovie gave the film a negative review, calling it "an incoherent concoction brewed solely to fill space on a double bill" while TV Guide panned the film, calling it "garbage".

Dennis Schwartz from Ozus' World Movie Reviews gave the film a negative review. In his review of the film, Schwartz called it "One of the most incoherent films ever made because the plot line can't be explained rationally nor are the characters clearly defined." When reviewing the film, Horror News.net also noted the reason behind its negative reputation: "The film itself falls into the 'worst' category with not only a lethargic presentation but with its odd-pieced editing style. Some scenes pop in out of nowhere that really don't seem to have much to do with the previous scene. Others are typical conversation scenes that are just edited back and forth in a haphazard way. I think the film stands better as a piece to be mocked and laughed at than as a real piece of important cinema. In fact, you may find humor in just those elements alone that make the experience one to look for mistakes, continuity errors and ridiculous logic at times. Why they felt the need that it needed some hipster dance scenes thrown in to sell more tickets is beyond me. But the result is so odd that it also deserves a laugh. It's classic B-grade miss mash that only has appeal in its disjointed effort."

See also
 List of films considered the worst

References

External links
 
 
 

1965 films
1965 horror films
1965 independent films
1960s science fiction horror films
American black-and-white films
American monster movies
American independent films
American science fiction horror films
Films directed by Herschell Gordon Lewis
Films directed by Bill Rebane
Films shot in Chicago
1960s monster movies
1960s unfinished films
Films about giants
1960s English-language films
1960s American films